Zbigniew Beta (born 2 July 1953) is a retired Polish long jumper.

He won the bronze medal at the 1975 European Indoor Championships. He became Polish champion in 1973, and Polish indoor champion in 1975.

His personal best jump was 7.77 metres, achieved in May 1974 in Warsaw. He had 7.82 metres on the indoor track, achieved in March 1975 in Katowice.

References

1953 births
Living people
Polish male long jumpers
Athletes from Warsaw